Isha Sánchez Hernández (Monterrey, Nuevo León, October 27, 1995) is a former Mexican rhythmic gymnastics athlete who competed in the 2010 Singapore Youth Olympic Games. She won a bronze medal at the 2009 Junior Pan American Games

References 

1995 births
Living people